Muhammad Faisal Kamal Alam (born 8 May 1969) has been Justice of the Sindh High Court since 30 October 2015.

External links 
 Caselaw For Sindh High Court

References

1969 births
Living people
Judges of the Sindh High Court
Pakistani judges